Burns Township may refer to:

Canada 

 Burns Township, Ontario, now part of Madawaska Valley

United States 

 Burns Township, Henry County, Illinois
 Burns Township, Michigan
 Burns Township, Anoka County, Minnesota, now the city of Nowthen

Township name disambiguation pages